Sergio Roura (born 7 September 1972) is a Spanish freestyle swimmer who competed in the 1992 Summer Olympics.

References

1972 births
Living people
Spanish male freestyle swimmers
Olympic swimmers of Spain
Swimmers at the 1992 Summer Olympics